Vincenzo Fucheri (died 1580) was a Roman Catholic prelate who served as Bishop of Corneto e Montefiascone (1578–1580).

Biography
On 29 January 1578, Vincenzo Fucheri was appointed during the papacy of Pope Gregory XIII as Bishop of Corneto e Montefiascone.
He served as Bishop of Corneto e Montefiascone until his death in 1580.

References

External links and additional sources
 (for Chronology of Bishops) 
 (for Chronology of Bishops) 

16th-century Italian Roman Catholic bishops
Bishops appointed by Pope Gregory XIII
1580 deaths